Patrick Jenkins is a Canadian artist, animator and documentary filmmaker living in Toronto, Ontario, Canada, who specializes in paint-on-glass animation, a form of stop motion animation.

Career

Patrick Jenkins studied Visual Art at York University in Toronto, earning a Master of Fine Arts (M.F.A) in Drawing and Filmmaking. After graduating, he made experimental films and exhibited his drawings in galleries in Toronto. He started making independent animated films in the 1985 and created and published his own flipbooks. He was approached by Kids Can Press to write and illustrate an instructional book to show children how to make flipbooks. The resulting book Flipbook Animation and Other Ways to Make Cartoons Move was published in 1991. The Addison Wesley Publishing Company also published this book in the U.S. with the title Animation.  Portuguese and French language editions were also released.

In 2008 he created Labyrinth, a short animated, surrealistic detective movie. In 2012 he followed it up with Sorceress, a mythological adventure story. Both films were done using paint-on-glass animation.

An independent filmmaker, he scripts, directs and animates his own films. His animated films have been shown at film festivals around the world including The Ottawa International Animation Festival, the London International Animation Festival and the Melbourne International Animation Festival. His documentaries on artists have been shown on Bravo! Television Canada and CBC Television.

Recent activity

His recent film Tara’s Dream won both Second Prize and Best Animation Prize at the 2010 Toronto Urban Film Festival. His film Amoeba won first prize at the 2010 Toronto Animated Image Society Showcase.  His film Inner View (2009), an animated homage to the art of Canadian artist Kazuo Nakamura was an Official Selection of Animafest Zagreb, Croatia in 2010. His film Labyrinth (2008), a surreal detective story, won 1st place in the Independent, 6 to 30 Minutes Category, at the 2009 Kalamazoo Animation Festival International (KAFI) and 3rd Prize for animation at the 2010 Be Film Festival in New York City and was included in the DVD the Best of the London International Animation Festival 2009. His documentaries, Of Lines And Men: The Animation Of Jonathan Amitay and Death Is In Trouble Now: The Sculptures Of Mark Adair premiered on Bravo! Television in October 2007. His film The Skateboarder premiered at the 2005 Montreal World Film Festival and was shown at the 2005 Ottawa International Animation Festival and the prestigious 2006 Annecy International Animation Film Festival (Festival International du Film d'Animation d'Annecy) in Annecy, France. His documentary film RALPH: Coffee, Jazz and Poetry, The Poetry of Ralph Alfonso premiered at the 2001 Montreal World Film Festival and was broadcast on CBC Television's Canadian Reflections and Bravo! Television.

Films and videotapes

2012-Sorceress, 35mm, colour, sound
2011-Tower Babel (sketch), DVD loop projection
2010-Amoeba, HDcam
2010-Tara’s Dream, HDcam
2009-Inner View, 35mm, colour, sound
2009-Towers Rising, DVD loop projection
2008-Labyrinth, 35mm, colour, sound
2007-Death Is In Trouble Now; The Sculptures of Mark Adair, Beta Sp, colour, sound
2007-Of Lines and Men; The Animation of Jonathan Amitay, Beta Sp, colour, sound
2005-The Skateboarder, Beta Sp, colour, sound
2004-Man Versus Geometry, Beta Sp, colour, sound
2003-Dancing Street, Beta Sp, colour, sound
2001-Ralph: Coffee, Jazz and Poetry; The Poetry of Ralph Alfonso, Beta Sp, colour, sound
2001-Crawling Around In A Fountain, Beta Sp, colour, sound
2000-This Is My Corner Of The World, Beta Sp, colour, sound
2000-Can You Pretend?, Beta Sp, colour, sound
1999-The Goatee Club, Beta Sp, colour, sound
1997-Venus In Violets, Beta Sp, colour, sound
1996-Animal Tales, T.V. Series, Beta Sp, colour, sound
1994-Animation For Kids, Beta Sp, colour, sound
1990-The Flipbook Movie, 16mm, colour, sound
1990-O.K. But I've Got To Get To Work..., 16mm, colour, sound
1986-Four Short Animated Films, 16mm, colour, sound
1982-Sign Language, 16mm, colour, sound
1981-Shadowplay, 16mm, colour, sound
1980-Ruse, 16mm, colour, sound
1980-A Sense of Spatial Organization, 16mm, colour, sound
1978-Fluster, 16mm, colour, sound
1976-Wedding Before Me, 16mm, colour, sound

Awards

Tara’s Dream, Second Prize and Best Animation Prize, 2010 Toronto Urban Film Festival*Amoeba first prize, 2010 Toronto Animated Image Society Showcase
Labyrinth, 1st place (the Independent, 6 to 30 Minutes Category), 2009 KAFI Festival in Kalamazoo, U.S.
Labyrinth, 3rd Prize for animation, 2010 Be Film Festival in New York City
Labyrinth, selected for the DVD the Best of the London International Animation Festival 2009.
Award between 1979-1996

Bibliography

2010 Feature article on film Labyrinth, Animation Reporter Magazine (April), Mumbai, India

Curator

2007 Death Is In Trouble Now: The Sculptures Of Mark Adair, Retrospective museum exhibition, Rodman Hall Art Centre, St. Catharines, Ontario
2006 John Straiton Retrospective, Ottawa International Animation Festival
2006 Beyond Cartoons, Animating the Personal, Cineworks, Vancouver, B.C.
2002 Jonathan Amitay Retrospective, Ottawa International Animation Festival
2002 Curatorial Essay for the exhibition "Of Lines And Men: The Cinema Of Jonathan Amitay", retrospective screening at the 2002 Ottawa International Animation Festival, National Arts Centre, Ottawa, October 2002

Books

1993 Out of This World, a flip book
1993 The Magic Wand, a flip book
1991 Flipbook Animation and Other Ways To Make Cartoons Move
1991 Skateboarding, a flip book
1991 Slap Shot!, a flip book
1988/1993 A Fishy Tale, a flip book
1988 Play Ball, a flip book
1987 In The Wink Of An Eye,
1987/1993 The Magician's Hat, a flip book
1987 Making Faces, a flip book

References

External links
Vimeo Patrick Jenkins

Year of birth missing (living people)
Living people
Film directors from Ontario
Canadian children's book illustrators
Canadian animated film directors